Douglas Laton Hoeft (May 26, 1942 – December 17, 2002) was a Republican member of the Illinois House of Representatives.

Hoeft was born May 26, 1942, in Rochester, Minnesota. He earned a Bachelor of Arts at Denison University and a doctorate of education at Northern Illinois University. Hoeft became the Kane County Regional Superintendent of Schools from 1987 to 1993. For a time prior to his political career, he was a coal miner. He served on the Illinois RiverWatch Network Steering Committee.

Hoeft died December 17, 2002, the same day as fellow Republican Timothy H. Osmond. He was succeeded by Ruth Munson, who took office December 30, 2002.

References

1942 births
2002 deaths
People from Elgin, Illinois
Educators from Illinois
Republican Party members of the Illinois House of Representatives
Politicians from Rochester, Minnesota
Denison University alumni
Northern Illinois University alumni